Borís Fyodorovich Godunóv (1552 ) ruled the Tsardom of Russia as de facto regent from c. 1585 to 1598 and then as the first non-Rurikid tsar from 1598 to 1605. After the end of his reign, Russia descended into the Time of Troubles.

Early years
Boris Godunov was the most noted member of an ancient, now extinct, Russian family of Tatar origin (Chet), which came from the Horde to Kostroma in the early 14th century. He was descended from the Tatar Prince Chet, who went from the Golden Horde to Russia and founded the Ipatiev Monastery in Kostroma. Boris was probably born before or after the Kazan campaign. Boris was the son of Feodor Ivanovich Godunov "Krivoy" ("the one-eyed") (died c. 1568–1570) and his wife Stepanida Ivanovna. His older brother Vasily died young and without issue. The 1552 Kazan Campaign occurred over summer and
autumn.
Godunov's career began at the court of Ivan the Terrible. He is mentioned in 1570 for taking part in the Serpeisk campaign as an archer of the guard. The following year he became an oprichnik – a member of Ivan's personal guard and secret police. In 1570/1571, Godunov strengthened his position at court by his marriage to Maria Grigorievna Skuratova-Belskaya, the daughter of Malyuta Skuratov-Belskiy, head of the oprichniks.

In 1580, the Tsar chose Boris Godunov's sister Irina Godunova (1557–1603) to be the wife of his second son and eventual heir, Feodor Ivanovich (1557–1598). On this occasion, Godunov was promoted to the rank of boyar. On 15 November 1581, Godunov was present when the Tsar murdered his own eldest son, the crown prince Ivan. Godunov tried to intervene but received blows from the Tsar's sceptre. The elder Ivan immediately repented, and Godunov rushed to get help for the Tsarevich, who died four days later.

Regency

Three years later, on his deathbed, Ivan IV appointed a council whose members consisted of Godunov, Feodor Nikitich Romanov, Vasili Shuiski and others to guide his son and successor of Russia Feodor I, who was feeble in both mind and body: "he took refuge from the dangers of the palace in devotion to religion; and though his people called him a saint, they recognized the fact that he lacked the iron to govern men."

At the time of his death, Ivan also had a three-year-old son, Dmitry Ivanovich (1581–1591), from his seventh and last marriage. This son (and his mother's family) had no claim to the throne because the Eastern Orthodox Church only recognized Ivan's first three marriages as legitimate. Shortly after Ivan's death, the council had both Dmitri and his mother, Maria Nagaya, moved to Uglich, some 120 miles north of Moscow. Dmitri died there in 1591 at the age of ten under suspicious circumstances.

When Dmitri's death was announced by the ringing of the church bell, the population of Uglich rose up in order to protest against the suspected assassination, which it believed was commissioned by Boris Godunov. Troops swiftly quelled the rebellion. Godunov ordered the removal of the Uglich bell's clapper (the bell's "tongue"). He had the offending bell ringer flogged in public and exiled to Siberia along with the townspeople who had not been executed.

An official commission which was headed by Vasili Shuiski was sent to determine the cause of the boy's death. The official verdict was that the boy had cut his throat during an epileptic seizure. Ivan's widow claimed that her son had been murdered by Godunov's agents. Godunov's guilt was never established and shortly thereafter, Dmitri's mother was forced to take the veil. Dmitry Ivanovich was laid to rest and promptly, though temporarily, forgotten.

At the coronation of Feodor Ivanovich as Tsar Feodor I on 31 May 1584, Boris received honors and riches as a member of the regency council, in which he held the second place during the life of the Tsar's uncle Nikita Romanovich. When Nikita died in 1586, Boris had no serious rival for the regency.

A group of other boyars and Dionysius II, Metropolitan of Moscow, conspired to break Boris's power by divorcing the Tsar from Godunov's childless sister. The attempt proved unsuccessful, and the conspirators were banished or sent to monasteries. After that, Godunov remained supreme in Russia and he corresponded with foreign princes as their equal.

His policy was generally pacific and always prudent. In 1595, he recovered from Sweden some towns lost during the former reign. Five years previously he had defeated a Tatar raid upon Moscow, for which he received the title of Konyushy, an obsolete dignity even higher than that of Boyar. He supported an anti-Turkish faction in the Crimea and gave the Khan subsidies in his war against the sultan.

Godunov encouraged English merchants to trade with Russia by exempting them from duties. He built towns and fortresses along the north-eastern and south-eastern borders of Russia to keep the Tatar and Finnic tribes in order. These included Samara, Saratov, Voronezh, and Tsaritsyn, as well as other lesser towns. He colonized Siberia with scores of new settlements, including Tobolsk.

During his rule, the Russian Orthodox Church received its patriarchate, placing it on an equal footing with the ancient Eastern churches and freeing it from the influence of the Patriarch of Constantinople. This pleased the Tsar, as Feodor took a great interest in church affairs.

In Godunov's most important domestic reform, a 1597 decree forbade peasants from transferring land from one landowner to another (which they had been freely able to do each year around Saint George's Day in November), thus binding them to the soil. This ordinance aimed to secure revenue, but it led to the institution of serfdom in its most oppressive form. (See also Serfdom in Russia.)

Reign

Upon the death of the childless Feodor on 7 January 1598, as well as the rumored assassination of Feodor's much younger brother Dimitry, supposedly ordered by Boris himself in order to guarantee his seat on the throne, self-preservation as much as ambition led to Boris' rise to power. Had he not done so, the mildest treatment he could have hoped for would have been lifelong seclusion in a monastery. His election was proposed by Patriarch Job of Moscow, who believed that Boris was the only man who was able to cope with the difficulties of the situation. Boris, however, would only accept the throne from the Zemsky Sobor (national assembly), which met on 17 February and unanimously elected him on 21 February. On 1 September, he was solemnly crowned tsar.

During the first years of his reign, he was both popular and prosperous, and ruled well. He recognized the need for Russia to catch up with the intellectual progress of the West and he did his best to bring about educational and social reforms. He was the first tsar to import foreign teachers on a large scale, the first tsar to send young Russians to be educated abroad, and the first tsar to allow Lutheran churches to be built in Russia. After the Russo–Swedish War (1590–1595), he attempted to gain access to the Baltic Sea and he also attempted to obtain Livonia by diplomatic means. He cultivated friendly relations with the Scandinavians and hoped to take a bride from a foreign royal house, thereby increasing the dignity of his own dynasty. However he declined the personal union proposed to him in 1600 by the diplomatic mission led by Lew Sapieha from the Polish–Lithuanian Commonwealth.

Boris died after a lengthy illness and a stroke on 13/23 April 1605. He left one son, Feodor II, who succeeded him but only ruled Russia for less than a month, until he and Boris' widow were murdered by the enemies of the Godunovs in Moscow on 10/20 June 1605. Boris's first son, Ivan, was born in 1587 and died in 1588. His daughter, Xenia, was born in 1582. She was engaged to Johann of Schleswig-Holstein, but he died shortly before their planned wedding in October 1602. Xenia was given the name "Olga" upon being forced to take monastic vows at the Voskresensky Monastery in Beloozero and her name is inscribed as "the Nun Olga Borisovna" at the crypt of the Godunovs at the Trinity Lavra of St. Sergius where she lived from 1606, when she sojourned there to attend the reburial of her father, until her death in 1622. Boris, his wife, and their children are buried together in a mausoleum near the entrance of the Assumption Cathedral at Trinity–St. Sergius Lavra.

Arts and popular media
Boris' life was dramatised by the founder of Russian literature, Alexander Pushkin, in his play Boris Godunov (1831), which was inspired by Shakespeare's Henry IV. Modest Mussorgsky based his opera Boris Godunov on Pushkin's play. Sergei Prokofiev later wrote incidental music for Pushkin's drama. In 1997, the score of a 1710 baroque opera based on the reign of Boris by German composer Johann Mattheson was rediscovered in Armenia and returned to Hamburg, Germany. This opera, never performed during the composer's lifetime, had its world premiere in 2005 at the Boston Early Music Festival & Exhibition.

Boris was portrayed on BBC Radio 4 by Shaun Dooley in the radio plays Ivan the Terrible: Absolute Power and Boris Godunov: Ghosts written by Mike Walker and which were the first two plays in the first series of Tsar. The plays were broadcast on 11 and 18 September 2016.

The 2018 Russian television miniseries Godunov (TV series) is a historical drama based on the lives of the Godunovs with a focus on Boris Godunov (played by Sergey Bezrukov) and lasted for two seasons.

The character Boris Badenov in the cartoon The Rocky and Bullwinkle Show takes his name from a play on Godunov's name.

Gallery

See also
 Bibliography of Russian history (1223–1613)
 Tsars of Russia family tree

References

External links
 
 online opera guide to Mussorgsky's Boris Godunov
 Godunov to Nicholas II by Saul Zaklad
 
 Ancestors of Boris Feodorovich Godunov, tsar of Russia (in Russian)
 Boris Godunov in English

 
1550s births
1605 deaths
16th-century Russian monarchs
17th-century Russian monarchs
Regents of Russia
Russian tsars
Eastern Orthodox monarchs
Russian people of Tatar descent
House of Godunov